State Route 173 (SR 173) is a  state highway that serves as a north-south connection between Headland and Abbeville in Henry County. SR 173 intersects US 431 at its southern terminus and SR 27 at its northern terminus.

Route description
SR 173 begins at its intersection with US 431 in Headland. From this point, SR 173 travels briefly towards the southwest before turning to the north as it leaves the town. From Headland, SR 173 follows a northerly track through its northern terminus at SR 27.

Major intersections

References

173
Transportation in Henry County, Alabama